The Order of the Occult Hand is a secret society of American journalists who have been able to slip the meaningless and telltale phrase "It was as if an occult hand had…" in print as an  inside joke.

History
The phrase was introduced by Joseph Flanders, then a police reporter of The Charlotte News, in the fall of 1965, when he reported on a millworker who was shot by his own family when he came back home late at night. He wrote:

Amused by this purple passage, in a local bar, his colleagues decided to commemorate Flanders's achievement by forming the Order of the Occult Hand. They even showed Flanders a banner made of a bed sheet depicting a bloody hand reaching out of a purple cloud. Among the original members were: R.C. Smith, an associate editor; Stewart Spencer, then an editorial writer; John Gin, the city editor; and several others, who vowed to get the words into print as soon as possible. The editors were not happy about this mischief at all and ordered copy editors to be extremely vigilant, yet the phrase kept slipping into the paper and even into Down Beat, a jazz magazine, by Smith. The News revealed this tradition of high spirits, how it started, in 1985, when it went out of circulation. 

Alternatively, Paul Greenberg, the Pulitzer prize-winning editorial page editor of the Arkansas Democrat-Gazette, claimed that Reese Cleghorn, then an editorial writer of The Charlotte Observer, was the one who originated the Order. Cleghorn denied this claim. The Boston Globe once reported that the Occult Hand Club was a replacement for the Defective Busbar Club, which was open to any journalist who used the word, such as in "the cause of the fire was attributed to a defective busbar, officials said."

The occult-hand phrase did not stop in the Charlotte News and Observer, but has crept onto other media. The use of the phrase has spread to newspaper media around the world like "a cough in a classroom" and "a pox". The Order was occasionally endangered by reckless and artless users of the phrase, but it retained overall secrecy until 2004, when James Janega of the Chicago Tribune published a thorough investigation about the Order. Upon exposure to the public, Greenberg made a full confession. 

In 2006, Greenberg announced that the Order had chosen a new secret phrase at an annual editorial writers' convention and resumed a stealth operation.

In 2020, the Fourth Estate announced an "Order of the Occult Hand" journalism challenge. The goal of the contest is to “encourage and recognize" the best use of a meaningless telltale phrase in a published news article within a specified time frame.  The phrase and parameters vary from challenge to challenge.

Members

The New York Times in 1974 by Paul Hofmann and in 1998 by Tim Race

"Wonders if Cyprus events might have been 'organized by some occult hand' as part of W Eur global strategy."

"Even worse, with some E-mail systems, if the writer doesn't fill in the subject line, the occult hand of artificial intelligence will enter No Subject."

The Los Angeles Times–Washington Post News Service in 1976 and 1984 by unknown

"...the patrol car appeared behind him as if deposited there by an occult hand."

" Now let's say we do that in time, if through some occult hand that occurs... " [putatively a quote from Grant Tinker]

The Los Angeles Times from 1983 to 1999 by Deborah Caulfield, Jay Sharbutt, Dennis McDougal, Charles Champlin, Nancy Wride, and Stephen Braun

"It was as if an occult hand had somehow palmed the film."

"It was as if an occult hand had passed over Nick Mancuso's face, momentarily transforming him into Tennessee Williams."

"...one might say it was as if an occult hand had hurled a raspberry at Hollywood."

"He said it is as if an occult hand had arbitrarily determined which..."

"...Saturday, it was as if an occult hand had passed over the Academy Awards..."

"Then it was as if an occult hand had made a mystical sign..."

"...I found myself seemingly driven by an occult hand into the arms of the Saturn..."

"It was as if an occult hand had substituted an alternate universe for..."

The Boston Globe from 1987 to 2000 by John Powers, M. R. Montgomery, Paul Hirshson, David Mehegan

"Bears president Mike McCaskey swore that it was as if an occult hand (belonging to the shade of Bears founder George Halas) had reached out and tipped the ball."

"In Newsweek, it is as if Sabrina were saved by an occult hand, as she 'turned up safe and sound.'"

"It's dark and scary, and has all kinds of spooky stuff in it, including a moving occult hand that actually -- well, we don't want to spoil the surprise."

"Inside, the lights go down and a sultry voice describes the audio systems, while some occult hand activates each component in turn."

"Nails, screws, small tools and thingamajigs accumulate and then relocate as if moved by an occult hand to some new hiding spot."

"If a president of Harvard ever intervenes in something like a promotion or a course outline, it is well disguised, the work of an occult hand."

"Just as the Gardner was negotiating with Humphries, the British weaving firm, a complete bit of that pattern, with the repeats, was revealed almost as if by an occult hand in Hokam Hall, home of Lord Leicester, in Wells-next-the-Sea, England."

"We like to think we have earned success, after all, and discount the occult hand of fate."

"he had a spectacular crash on his Segway when one of the wheels magically flew off, as if an occult hand had reached down from above and removed it. Or he hit a curb too fast

The Associated Press from 1978 to 2006 by Jay Sharbutt, Scott Williams, Eric Fidler, John Skoyles, and Joann Loviglio

"As the show wears on, your eyelids may slam shut, as if tugged by an occult hand.

"Veil became the pawn of a conspiracy so vast it's as if an occult hand had plucked him out of our reality and dropped him into a private nightmare."

"When he plays the blues, it is as if some occult hand is guiding his hand over the guitar, channeling the essence of the blues through Clapton."

"It is as if an occult hand placed Calvino in our country so we could appreciate our own eccentricities."

"After venturing through museum catacombs and rooms that held everything from whale eyeballs to flesh-eating beetles feasting on animal carcasses, it was as if an occult hand led them to the hall of Cretaceous dinosaurs.

The Arkansas Democrat-Gazette from 1993 to 2004 by Paul Greenberg and Kane Webb

"It was as if an occult hand was at work, or maybe a screenwriter for one of Mel Brooks' slapstick comedies."

"It's as if an occult hand had reached into newspaper offices across the country and assembled a whole menagerie of opinionators, from the ring-tailed roarers to the loyal meeks."

"Then there's the care Hillary Clinton, Esq. took with those disappearing billing records, which had the strangest way of appearing years later in the White House--as if an occult hand were moving them about."

"As if by an occult hand, the following correspondence was delivered to the White House mail room yesterday:"

"And now, as if by an occult hand, Harry himself has been freed."

"The Dan Ryan and Eisenhower Expressways would be overrun with stalled vehicles, as if an occult hand had just emptied the Loop.

"As if by an occult hand, they appear-mama, papa, and baby."

The Washington Times from 1996 to 1998 by Rex Bowman, Sean Scully, Ronald J. Hansen, and Jim Keary

"And on Tuesday, as if an occult hand were meting out justice to the senator, Mark Warner seemed poised to make the same comeback."

"It was as if an occult hand had reached down to throw beleaguered Democrat Donald S. Beyer Jr. a wee crumb on an otherwise bleak night."

"It was as if an occult hand had delivered a cold slap of reality to the efforts of D.C. Chief Management Officer Camille Cates Barnett, who hopes to make the parking system work again."

"But even with that explanation, it was as if an occult hand swept him away - into handcuffs and into the back seat of a police cruiser."

Stars and Stripes March 28, 2002 by David Allen
 :"It was if an occult hand swept rain clouds Okinawa's way." 

The Virginian-Pilot in 1997 by Larry Maddry

"The fact is a food item which seems inert in a glass container - cocktail sauce for shrimp is a good example - has been known to sail as far as 15 feet to where I stand and hit the sleeve of my coat as though tossed by an occult hand."

The Washington Post in 1997 by Linton Weeks

"It was as if an occult hand had guided the black sphere down the narrow lane and into the triangle of pins."

The Post-Standard in 2000 by an anonymous author

"As if moved by an occult hand, phantom emus keep popping up in Oswego County."

Star-Tribune in 2001 and 2002 by Eric Hanson and Kristin Tillotson

"It was as if an occult hand had taken Chuck Klosterman's radio, tuned away from the Top 40 ear candy of Duran Duran and the Stray Cats, and tuned into the satanic debauchery of Motley Crue."

"It was as if an occult hand had reached down and given the nation's television critics a pinch on the tush."

The Bangkok Post from 2002 to 2007 by Wanda Sloan

"Mr Charoen said he never interfered in such a minor business venture, but it was as if an occult hand had touched the plaza and every vendor suddenly promised to sell only legal software, movies and music."

"A curious and concerned reader named Joe clicked on "Tools" and then "Windows Update" and found himself transported as if by an occult hand to WindowsUpdate.Microsoft.com—where he was confronted by a staggering 22 update packages for Windows XP and a staggering lack of instructions on what to do about it."

"Greenpeace campaigner Patwajee Sri-suwan denied removing anything from the centre; by incredible coincidence, as if by an occult hand, Greenpeace found a papaya tree 60km from the research site, no idea how it got there."

"Finally, as if by an occult hand, there it was out on the table, your TOT Corp coming clean;"

"it was almost as if some occult hand had guided the convenient contract issuance."

Others

"Privilege escalation acts as if an occult hand had reached down and simply placed an unwarranted person in the midst of juicy storehouses of data."

"looked like an occult hand had reached down and scrambled the lives of the park’s residents into a sodden and mud-coated shambles."

"It's as if an occult hand had reached out and intentionally destroyed your data."

"One morning last week, while pondering the daily question of khakis vs. jeans, it was as if an occult hand reached down and plucked the baggy green pants from the hanger and thrust them at me."

"It was as if an occult hand had pointed you out to each other."

"As if an occult hand had slipped over his shoulder to assist, the little plastic shelf slides back into the machine and begins to whirr."

"It’s as though an occult hand has dug a channel to the Mississippi River, allowing its raucous current to flow through the lake once again after centuries of separation."

"It is as if some occult hand were at work, discouraging the arts market."

"As if an occult hand moved her to action, she discovered the intercom worked both ways."

"DiPietro picked up a small instrument that monitored the CO2 level. “Getting up there,” he noted. A few minutes later, as if by the wave of an occult hand, an alarm rang."

"In Evans' recounting, it was as if an occult hand had swept him aside, replacing him with new leadership, in which Lang had been tapped to call the shots."

"But as Lane began to apologize, the engine kicked in with a puff, as if an occult hand had turned the crank, and the crowd cheered."

"Servers work the room gracefully. Empty plates are removed and empty glasses are refilled as if by an occult hand; certainly beyond my notice and I tend to notice such things."

Ellison, Garret (19 September 2019). "Why won't Wolverine engage with EPA-formed citizen group?". The Grand Rapids Press
"Wolverine’s absence hung over the gathering like an occult hand; simultaneously central to the matter, yet apart and of concern to the citizen board."

The Seattle Times in 2016 by Jennifer McDermott from The Associated Press
 
"Some devotees have even reported feeling icy fingers on their arms and wrists, as if an occult hand had grabbed them."
Trichur, Rita (Feb. 13, 2020). "Blame Ottawa for OSFI’s U-turn on mortgage stress tests"  The Globe and Mail. "It was as if an occult hand had prompted the regulator to contradict itself."
Lanning, Courtney (Aug. 3, 2019). "EDITORIAL: Might have to rethink phrase, 'Dead as Dillinger'" The Arkansas Democrat-Gazette. "It was as if an occult hand had shaped that year to see these criminals dead."

References

Further reading
 
 
 
 
 

1965 establishments in North Carolina
History of mass media in the United States
In-jokes
Journalistic hoaxes
Organizations established in 1965
Professional humor
Secret societies in the United States